Magnesium perchlorate is a powerful oxidizing agent, with the formula Mg(ClO4)2. The salt is also a superior drying agent for gas analysis.

Magnesium perchlorate decomposes at 250 °C. The heat of formation is -568.90 kJ mol−1.

The enthalpy of solution is quite high, so reactions are done in large amounts of water to dilute it.

It is sold under the trade name anhydrone. Manufacture of this product on a semi-industrial scale was first performed by G. Frederick Smith in his garage in Urbana Illinois, but later at a permanent facility in Columbus, OH called G. Frederick Smith Chemical Co. He sold the magnesium perchlorate to A. H. Thomas Co., now Thomas Scientific, under the trade name Dehydrite.

Uses
It is used as desiccant to dry gas or air samples, but is no longer advised, for use as a general desiccant, due to hazards inherent in perchlorates. It is dried by heating at 220 °C under vacuum.

Magnesium perchlorate and other perchlorates have been found on Mars. Being a drying agent, magnesium perchlorate retains water from the atmosphere and may release it when conditions are favorable and temperature is above 273 K. Briny solutions that contain salts such as magnesium perchlorate have a lower melting point than that of pure water. Therefore the abundance of magnesium and other perchlorate salts on Mars could support the theory that liquid aqueous solutions might exist on or below the surface, where temperature and pressure conditions would ordinarily cause the water to freeze.

Production
Magnesium perchlorate is produced by the reaction of magnesium hydroxide and perchloric acid.

References

Perchlorates
Magnesium compounds